Yang Xu (born 12 February 1988) is a Chinese professional footballer who currently plays for Chinese Super League club Shanghai Shenhua.

Club career
Yang Xu started his football career when he made his debut for Liaoning Whowin on 16 April 2005 in a 1–0 loss against Shanghai Shenhua. He scored his first goal for the club on 5 May 2005 in a 3–1 win against Shenzhen Jianlibao. By the end of the 2005 season, Yang scored three league goals in 11 appearances and saw his club finish in a tenth-place position. The following season would see Yang continue to establish himself with the squad by making a further 20 league appearances and scoring three goals; however, most of his appearances came from the bench. By the 2008 season, he was still a squad player trying to establish himself as the main striker within the team; however, he was unable to help Liaoning avoid relegation at the end of the season. Staying with the club, Yang was promoted to first-choice striker at the start of the 2009 league season and he would repay them with 15 league goals in 22 appearances, making him the second best goalscorer in the league. His goals would aid Liaoning to win the division title and immediate promotion back to the top flight.

On 27 February 2013, Yang transferred to fellow Chinese Super League side Shandong Luneng. In July 2014, he was loaned to Changchun Yatai for the rest of the 2014 season. On 26 February 2017, Yang transferred to fellow top-tier side Tianjin Quanjian and was immediately loaned to his former club Liaoning Whowin for one season. He made his first appearance since returning to the club on 3 March 2017 in a 1–1 draw against Guizhou Zhicheng.

International career
Yang was called up to the Chinese national team and made his international debut on 30 September 2009 in a 4–1 win against Botswana. Despite playing for a second-tier side he would be tried out in several friendlies before he was given his chance to play in a qualifying match for the AFC Asian Cup in a 2–1 win against Vietnam on 17 January 2010 where he also scored his debut goal. On 30 March 2011, he scored twice in a 3–0 win against Honduras and on 23 July 2011, he scored a hat-trick in a 7–2 win against Laos.

Career statistics

Club statistics
.

International statistics

International goals

Scores and results list China's goal tally first.

Honours

Club
Liaoning Whowin
China League One: 2009
Shandong Luneng
Chinese FA Super Cup: 2015

International
China national under-17 football team
AFC U-17 Championship: 2004

China PR national football team
East Asian Football Championship: 2010

References

External links
Player stats at sohu.com
 
 

1988 births
Living people
Chinese footballers
Footballers from Dalian
China international footballers
Liaoning F.C. players
Shandong Taishan F.C. players
Changchun Yatai F.C. players
Tianjin Tianhai F.C. players
Chinese Super League players
China League One players
2011 AFC Asian Cup players
2015 AFC Asian Cup players
Association football forwards